Raffles Medical Group (RMG), (Chinese: 莱佛士医疗集团 : Lái fú shì yīliáo jítuán) is a private healthcare provider in Asia, operating medical facilities in thirteen cities in Singapore, China, Japan, Vietnam and Cambodia.

RMG has a network of clinics with family physicians, specialists and dental surgeons and owns Raffles Hospital, a tertiary care hospital in Singapore, which accommodates surgical centres, medical laboratories and 24 specialist centres in various areas like Obstetrics & Gynaecology, Cardiology, Oncology and Orthopaedics.

RMG's medical practice is based on the Group Practice Model.

RMG has its own consumer healthcare division which develops and distributes nutraceuticals, supplements, vitamins and medical diagnostic equipment.

RMG is a member of the Mayo Clinic Care Network.

History

Founding 
In 1976, the group's founders, Dr Loo Choon Yong and Dr Alfred Loh, opened their first two clinics in Singapore's Central Business District with the aim of providing medical services to corporate clients. By 1989, this had grown to five clinics and it was then that the two friends decided to incorporate their clinics into a medical practice group. Expanding after its incorporation, RMG moved into Singapore's HDB heartlands with their first neighbourhood clinic in 1993. The first of these areas included Telok Blangah, Bishan, Ang Mo Kio, Siglap, Tampines, Pasir Ris and Bedok.

In 1990, RMG tendered and obtained a contract with the Civil Aviation Authority of Singapore to provide medical services to the passengers transiting through Changi International Airport as well as airport workers. This also marked RMG's first 24-hour clinic.

Patients of Raffles Medical Clinics that required specialist care were initially referred to the public hospitals or private specialists. In 1991, RMG appointed specialists in its medical staff. The Group consolidated its specialist service in 1993 with the opening of Raffles SurgiCentre at No. 182 Clemenceau Avenue – the first free-standing day surgery centre at Southeast Asia.  It had four operating theatres, 28 recovery beds and two beds in intensive care unit.

By 1996, the network of clinics had grown to 30 branches covering most parts of Singapore.  When Raffles SurgiCentre saw a lack of space for further expansion, Dr Loo began looking for a site to build a hospital. They eventually settled on Blanco Court, a commercial building at the intersection of North Bridge Road and Ophir Road. Construction works to convert it into a hospital began in 1999. This culminated in the opening of the 380-bed Raffles Hospital on 31 March 2001. It consists of 24 different specialist centres which provides specialist services such as obstetrics and gynaecology, cardiology, oncology and orthopaedics.

Today, the Group is present in Singapore, China, Vietnam, Cambodia and Japan. The Group runs a network of 106 multi-disciplinary clinics across Singapore and medical centres in Hong Kong, Shanghai and Osaka. Raffles Medical Group also has representative offices in Indonesia, Vietnam, Cambodia, Brunei and Bangladesh, as well as associates throughout the Asia-Pacific region. Airport clinics in Singapore's Changi International Airport and Hong Kong's Chek Lap Kok International Airport are also managed by them.

Medical and clinical support services

Raffles Hospital
 Health Screening
 Outpatient and Inpatient Care
 Intensive Care Unit
 Day Surgery
 Angiography 
 International Patient Information and Customer services (Raffles IPC)
 24 hour Emergency Unit
 Medical Evacuation

Raffles Medical Clinics
These clinics offer primary healthcare services in various locations in Singapore.

Raffles Specialist Centres
 Raffles Cancer Centre
 Raffles Children Centre
 Raffles Chinese Medicine
 Raffles Counselling Centre
 Raffles Diabetes & Endocrine Centre
 Raffles Dental
 Raffles Dialysis Centre
 Raffles ENT Centre
 Raffles Eye Centre
 Raffles Fertility Centre
 Raffles Health Screeners 
 Raffles Heart Centre
 Raffles Internal Medicine Centre
 Raffles Japanese Clinic
 Raffles Neuroscience Centre
 Raffles Nuclear Medicine Centre
 Raffles Orthopaedic Center
 Raffles Pain Management Centre
 Raffles Radiology
 Raffles Rehabilitation Centre
 Raffles Skin & Aesthetics
 Raffles Surgery Centre
 Raffles Urology Centre
 Raffles Women Centre

Raffles Medical International
RMG operates three medical centres in Hong Kong and medical centres in Shanghai and Osaka.

Raffles Health 
RMG has its own consumer healthcare division, Raffles Health, which develops and distributes nutraceuticals, supplements, vitamins and medical diagnostic equipment.

Notable births 
The first ‘Raffles Baby’ was born on 19 July 2001 at 7:20pm, delivered by Consultant Obstetrician and Gynaecologist, Dr Joan Thong Pao-Wen. The healthy baby girl weighed 3250g at birth. Raffles Hospital's first triplets were delivered a few days before Christmas in 2004.

Notable surgeries 
Raffles Hospital undertook the surgical separation of a pair of adult craniopagus twins, Laleh Bijani and Ladan Bijani of Iran. The surgery was led by Dr Pierre Lasjaunias, a French neuro-radiologist. Separation was achieved. However, both twins died due to significant blood loss in the blood vessel repairing process.

Raffles hospital separated another set of conjoined twins Ji Hye and Sa Rang. They underwent a successful surgery on 22 July 2003. On 16 August, both twins were discharged almost a month after their operation.

American Ryan Boarman was bitten by a shark on his right elbow on 25 April 2016. After spending some time in Balinese hospitals, he was transferred to Singapore's Raffles Hospital on 29 April 2016, where he went under the knife of orthopaedic surgeon Dr Lim Yeow Wai. The American had suffered a 360-degree laceration around the elbow, with the shark biting, pulling off and shearing away at least eight muscles and tendons and injuring one nerve and one ligament.

Corporate affairs

Financial performance 
RMG started out as a two-clinic practice in 1976 under its founders. In 2009, their revenue grew 8.9% to S$218 million, while profit after tax increased by 20% to S$38 million. The Group's profits continue to grow through the financial year of 2010, reaching S$311 million in 2012.

Corporate culture 
RMG is an integrated private healthcare provider in Singapore based on the Group Practice Model. Full-time doctors practice exclusively and adhere to protocols and fee schedules set by the hospital.

Charitable causes 
RMG's humanitarian arm, Asian Medical Foundation (AMF), is a non-profit organisation was started in 2003 to offer medical expertise in areas with poor access to health care services. AMF sent its first relief mission to Aceh on 26 December to assist in the 2004 Asian tsunami crisis. AMF also sent medical aid to the earthquake victims in Nias, Indonesia and Pakistan in 2005.

References

External links 
 Official Website
Raffles Health

Companies listed on the Singapore Exchange
Health care companies of Singapore
Singaporean brands